The Mount Whitney Fish Hatchery, located in Independence, California, in the United States, is an historic fish hatchery that has played an important role in the preservation of the golden trout, California's state fish.

Construction
The facility was built and operated by the California State Fish & Game Commission, now known as the California Department of Fish and Wildlife.  Starting in 1915, the citizens of Independence began a local fundraising drive to purchase a site for a proposed state fish hatchery.  $1,500.00 was raised, and an ideal  site was purchased on Oak Creek, just north of the town.  Fish and Game Commissioner M. J. Connell instructed the design team led by Charles Dean of the State Department of Engineering "to design a building that would match the mountains, would last forever, and would be a showplace for all time." The architectural style they chose is Tudor Revival.  Construction began in March, 1916, with a final budget of approximately $60,000.00.  The walls of the building are constructed using  of native granite collected within a quarter mile (400 m) of the site.  The walls are two to three feet (600 to 900 mm) thick.  The roof is red Spanish tile made in Lincoln, California.

Operation

When construction was completed in 1917, it was the largest and best equipped hatchery in California and could produce 2,000,000 fish fry per year.  Initially, fish eggs were collected from the Rae Lakes and were transported to the hatchery by mule train.  Since 1918, golden trout eggs have been collected from the Cottonwood Lakes.  This program is the sole source of California golden trout eggs, currently operated by the nearby Black Rock Fish Hatchery since the closure of Mt Whitney Hatchery in 2008.

In July 1931, the Mount Whitney Fish Hatchery and the Colorado Fish Commission traded 30,000 Colorado River cutthroat trout eggs for 25,000 golden trout eggs.  The resulting Colorado cutthroat fry were planted in remote High Sierra lakes at very high elevations.  Over the following 50 years, the population in Colorado became endangered due to habitat destruction and interbreeding with other species of trout.  The cutthroats now living in California remained pure.  In 1987, California and Colorado cooperated to transplant 50 genetically pure cutthroats back to a remote lake in Rocky Mountain National Park, where they thrived.

Proposed closure
In 1996, the California Department of Fish and Game proposed closing the hatchery due to budget cuts.  Local and statewide opposition to the closure developed, and instead, a plan was approved to save the facility in order to "provide the public with an interpretation of the historical significance of the hatchery, knowledge of the hatchery's function and an understanding of our natural resources".  Legislation was passed designating the "Friends of the Mt. Whitney Fish Hatchery" as a private group authorized to lease part of the hatchery in order to maintain and preserve it, in coordination with the State Office of Historic Preservation.

Wildfire and mudslide
On July 5, 2007, a  wildfire burned upstream to the west of the Mount Whitney Fish Hatchery. As a result, a year later, on July 12, 2008, a heavy thunderstorm caused a massive mudslide in the fire-scarred Oak Creek watershed that swept downstream, severely damaging the ponds and water supplies of the hatchery, as well as two employee housing units.  The main building escaped major damage. The Friends of the Mt. Whitney Fish Hatchery organized restoration work that allowed the interpretive center and display pond to re-open on May 30, 2009.   However, the future of full-scale hatchery production is uncertain.

The first group of fish to come out of the hatchery in three years were planted in Diaz Lake, and a Kids Fishing Day was held in May, 2010.  An expanded interpretive center is in the planning stages.

See also 
 Golden Trout Wilderness

References

Fish hatcheries in the United States
Owens Valley
Agriculture in California
Buildings and structures in Inyo County, California
Tudor Revival architecture in California
Commercial buildings completed in 1917
Government buildings completed in 1917
Aquaculture in the United States
Water in California
Tourist attractions in Inyo County, California
Agricultural buildings and structures in California
1917 establishments in California